

Tag management a posteriori 
Tags can be gardened down-hill (after they have entered the data set) by
 Renaming tags (e.g. typos)
 Deleting tags
 Moving tags to correct facets (e.g. an organization name)
 Merging tags (e.g. single and plural words)

Examples of tag management 
 Content management systems: WordPress, Microsoft SharePoint Drupal,
 Enterprise bookmarking tools: Jumper 2.0, Knowledge Plaza

References 
 

Knowledge management
Folksonomy
Taxonomy
Collaborative software